Petar Atanasov Petrov (born 20 February 1961) is a Bulgarian former footballer who played as a left back.

Club career 
Born in Virovsko, Petrov started playing for PFC Levski Sofia. During his spell with the club – renamed Vitosha Sofia in 1985 – he was first-choice in seven of nine seasons, winning three national championships and two Bulgarian Cups; he scored a career-best five goals in 29 games in 1984–85.

Petrov was allowed to leave the Iron Curtain nation in 1989, at the age of 28, and signed with Portuguese team S.C. Beira-Mar. After four years, always in the Primeira Liga, he returned to his homeland and joined PFC Beroe Stara Zagora, retiring subsequently.

International career 
Petrov gained 47 caps for Bulgaria in six years. He was part of the squad that competed at the 1986 FIFA World Cup, He didn't play in the opening game against Italy (1-1) but played in all the other matches for Bulgaria.

References

External links 
Levski Sofia profile 

1961 births
Living people
Bulgarian footballers
Association football defenders
First Professional Football League (Bulgaria) players
PFC Levski Sofia players
PFC Beroe Stara Zagora players
Primeira Liga players
S.C. Beira-Mar players
Bulgaria international footballers
1986 FIFA World Cup players
Bulgarian expatriate footballers
Expatriate footballers in Portugal
Bulgarian expatriate sportspeople in Portugal